Toby Edward Albert (born 12 November 2001) is an English cricketer. He made his Twenty20 debut on 9 July 2021, for Hampshire in the 2021 T20 Blast. He made his first-class debut on 13 May 2022, for Hampshire against the Sri Lanka Cricket Development XI side during their tour of England. Later, he made his List A debut on 5 August 2022, for Hampshire in the 2022 Royal London One-Day Cup.

References

External links
 

2001 births
Living people
Cricketers from Basingstoke
English cricketers
Hampshire cricketers
Berkshire cricketers